The Vice President of the State Council of Cambodia was the deputy head of state of People's Republic of Kampuchea and State of Cambodia from 1979 to 1993.

List of vice presidents

See also
Deputy Presidents of the State Presidium of Kampuchea

References
Various editions of The Europa World Year Book

Lists of political office-holders in Cambodia
Cambodia